The 1979–80 Soviet League Season was the 34th year of competition in the Soviet Championship League. CSKA Moscow won the championship, its 4th in a row and 23rd overall.

Regular season

Relegation

External links
Season on hockeystars.ru

1979–80 in Soviet ice hockey
Soviet League seasons
Sov